Saint Aurelia of Regensburg (died 1027), also known as Aurelia of Ratisbon, is an 11th-century Roman Catholic German saint.

Life
According to local tradition, Aurelia was a daughter of Hugh Capet, the first King of the Franks. She fled, disguised as a pilgrim, in order to escape a marriage arranged by her parents against her will. Following the advice of Saint Wolfgang, Bishop of Ratisbon, who saw through her disguise, she accepted the life of a solitary and entered St. Emmeram's Abbey near Regensburg, where she remained for about fifty-two years.

The reputation of her sanctity, evidenced by several miracles, was widespread at the time of her death in 1027. Her relics were enshrined, and her hermitage converted into a chapel, which became a popular pilgrimage site.

Aurelia's name comes from the Latin term aureus meaning "golden".

References

Austrian Roman Catholic saints
German Roman Catholic saints
11th-century Christian saints
1027 deaths
Year of birth unknown
Female saints of medieval Germany
11th-century German nobility
11th-century German women